The 2022 West Coast Conference men's basketball tournament was the postseason men's basketball tournament for the West Coast Conference (WCC) during the 2021–22 NCAA Division I men's basketball season. The tournament was held during March 3–8, 2022, at the Orleans Arena in Paradise, Nevada. Los Angeles-based University Credit Union was the title sponsor of the tournament for the fourth consecutive year. The winner of the tournament, the Gonzaga Bulldogs, received the conference's automatic bid to the 2022 NCAA Division I men's basketball tournament.

Venue 
For the 14th consecutive year, the 2022 WCC Tournament was held in the Orleans Arena. When Orleans Arena is set up for basketball games, the seating capacity is 7,471. The Orleans Arena is located at the 1,886-room Orleans Hotel and Casino, about 1 mile west of the Las Vegas Strip. Tickets for the WCC Tournament typically sell out quickly. In 2021, due to the COVID-19 pandemic, no fans were permitted to attend this tournament.

Seeds 
All 10 WCC schools participated in the tournament. Teams are typically seeded by conference record, with a tiebreaker system used to seed teams with identical conference records. However, due to numerous regular-season game cancellations, the WCC announced that the seeding for the 2021 edition would be determined using an adjusted conference winning percentage. With several conference games being canceled during the 2022 regular season, the conference was expected to use the adjusted conference winning percentage for seeding the 2022 tournament. Developed in partnership with Ken Pomeroy, the adjusted conference winning percentage (Pomeroy AWP) takes into account the strength of the opponent and the location where each game was played. The tournament followed a format similar to that used from 2003 to 2011. The 7 through 10 seeds played in the "first round", the 5 and 6 seeds started play in the "second round", and the 3 and 4 seeds started in the "quarterfinals". The top two seeds received byes into the semifinals. As expected, the WCC released the tournament seedings based on the Pomeroy AWP a few days prior to the start of the tournament.

Schedule

Notes 
 RSNs airing the games include Bally Sports, AT&T SportsNet Rocky Mountain, and NBC Sports California. (RSNs may not carry every game)

Bracket 

* denotes overtime period

See also 
 2022 West Coast Conference women's basketball tournament
 West Coast Conference men's basketball tournament
 West Coast Conference

References 

West Coast Conference men's basketball tournament
Tournament
2022 in sports in Nevada
Basketball competitions in the Las Vegas Valley
College basketball tournaments in Nevada
College sports tournaments in Nevada